Zolotyi Potik (or Potok; ;) is an urban-type settlement in Chortkiv Raion (district) of Ternopil Oblast (province) in western Ukraine. It hosts the administration of Zolotyi Potik settlement hromada, one of the hromadas of Ukraine. Population:

History
The settlement "Zahaipole" was founded in 1388. In 1570, it was re-established under the ownership of the House of Potocki as "Potok" - the name connected with the family's surname. Potok was first mentioned in written sources in the late 16th century, as part of the territory ceded by Sigismund I the Old to Sigismund II Augustus. In 1601, it was granted Magdeburg rights and renamed "Potok Złoty" ("Golden Brook").

When Stefan Potocki established Potok Złoty, he modified his coat of arms by changing the silver cross to gold - in this way, the Piława Potocki line evolved into two branches: silver and golden.  He and his wife, Maria Mohylanka, founded a church and convent of St. Stefan in the town. Jakub Potocki and Stefan Potocki are both buried there.

In 1676, the invading Turkish-Tartar army destroyed the local castle. After the first partition of Poland in 1772, the town was controlled by the Holy Roman Empire (until 1804), the Austrian Empire (until 1867), Austria-Hungary (until 1919), Poland (until 1939), and finally the USSR (until 1991). In 1984, Zolotyi Potik was granted the status of an urban-type settlement.

During the German occupation, its Jewish inhabitants, comprising around one-third of the total population, were mostly expelled  to Buchach and then transported to the Bełżec extermination camp or shot.

Until 18 July 2020, Zolotyi Potik belonged to Buchach Raion. The raion was abolished in July 2020 as part of the administrative reform of Ukraine, which reduced the number of raions of Ternopil Oblast to three. The area of Buchach Raion was merged into Chortkiv Raion.

Landmarks and points of interest
 Ruins of the late Renaissance castle built by Stefan Potocki, 
 Church of the Holy Trinity
 Chapel of Our Mother of God of Zarvanytsia
 Belfry 
 Mission cross to the 100th anniversary of the Church of Holy Trinity
 Symbolic grave of Ukrainian Sich Riflemen (restored in 1991).

References

Sources
 

 
Urban-type settlements in Chortkiv Raion
Populated places established in the 1380s